The Zamittello Palace, also known as Castello Zamittello or Zamittello Tower, is a 19th-century Victorian countryside folly on the outskirts of Mġarr, Malta, on the road leading to Ġnejna. It was built by Sir Giuseppe Nicola Zamitt and has remained in the same family for the past 200 years.  Count Francis Sant Cassia,a cousin of the owner,  was its last resident and was murdered outside the premises in 1988. To date the case has not been solved. It is now used for private functions and wedding receptions.

History
The castle was built by the Sir Giuseppe Nicola Zamitt in the early nineteenth century as a countryside folly  in the limits of Mġarr in Malta, although commercial sources claim that it dates back to 1675. 

The last resident, Count Francis Sant Cassia was a cousin of the owner Count Francis Manduca and was murdered just outside the premises  on 27 October 1988. The case has not been solved.  It is now used as a wedding venue and for private functions.

Architecture

The Zammitello Palace is a 19th-century ornate architectural folly, built in imitation of the Tower of London. Although it resembles a fortification, according to military architecture expert Stephen C. Spiteri, it is "entirely useless from a defensive point of view".

The names given to the building are a misnomer as it is closely comparable to a country house villa, and its outline is a square-shaped residence designed with typical Victorian architecture. It prominently features one roof-level turret and four guerites. The latter have a unique design and were never desirable nor used in Maltese military context. Above the turret sits a Christian cross, in the form of a crucifix.

Further reading
.

References

Notes

Palaces in Malta
Victorian architecture in Malta
Mġarr